Yvonne Carol Nolan is a British Labour politician and former Leader of Wirral Council.

She was first elected to Wirral Council in 1987 to Moreton ward beating three time incumbent Conservative David Williams. She became Leader of the Council and Leader of the Labour group once Labour gained a significant minority at the 1990 election. Although Labour gained control of the council in 1991, Nolan lost her seat to Conservative Ann Dishman by 1,200 votes.

In 2018, she was selected as the Labour candidate for the Rock Ferry beating the incumbent of 28 years, Chris Meaden. Meaden stood against Nolan but lost by 185 votes.

Electoral performance

References

|-

|-

|

Living people
Labour Party (UK) councillors
Members of Wirral Council
Year of birth missing (living people)
Leaders of local authorities of England
Women councillors in England